Nathan Hylden (born 1978 in Fergus Falls, Minnesota) is a contemporary American abstract painter based in Los Angeles, California. He is known for creating abstract paintings exploring philosophical relationships between cause and effect, absence and presence, and emptiness and meaning; as well as for process-oriented artworks that investigate dualities of existence.

Hylden earned his Bachelor of Fine Arts from Minnesota State University in 2001 and Master of Fine Arts from Art Center College of Design in Los Angeles in 2006. He later studied with abstract painter Michael Krebber in Frankfurt, photographer  Christopher Williams, and multimedia artist Richard Hawkins in Los Angeles.

Painting style 
Hylden utilizes diverse media in his paintings, such as aluminum, pearlescent paint, spray paints, and even blank canvases. Hylden often questions the essence of painting in his artworks.

His pieces are often produced as a series and follow a very strict creative process which links all the works through common motifs. Even though the pieces in a series are linked to each other, each one tells a particular story and represents a particular point in time in the evolution of the sequence. For his 2010 series of nine paintings, Hylden devised a strict technical process of painting canvases with holographic gold, arranging them on the floor, spray painting the overlapping sections in yellow, and finally stenciling black stripes onto each piece. As such, he created unique but interconnected pieces.

Hylden likes to hint at the source of his abstract paintings. His studio is a source of his inspiration and he has incorporated images of simple objects or groupings of objects from his studio into his paintings. His solo exhibition So There’s That at Richard Telles Fine Art displays two paintings which depict a vastly magnified portion of the wall in his studio. The art critic Alicia Eler described this as ability to re-contextualize the mundane in the context of art.

Exhibitions 
Hylden's works have been exhibited internationally.

Solo exhibitions 
Some of his selected solo exhibitions include:
 2019, Hakgojae Gallery, Seoul, South Korea
 2018, For Now And So, Misako & Rosen, Tokyo, Japan
 2018, So Doing, Galerie Art Concept, Paris, France
 2017, Nearing On To Do, Midway Contemporary Art, Minneapolis, the United States
 2015, Nathan Hylden, Johann Konig, Berlin, Germany
 2014, Off All Things, Misako & Rosen, Tokyo, Japan
 2014, More Over, Art: Concept, Paris, France
 2013, Meanwhile, Kunstverein, Hamburg, Germany
 2011, So There’s That, Richard Telles Fine Art, Los Angeles, US
 2011, Volker Bradtke, Düsseldorf, Germany

Group exhibitions 
 2018, Did you close your eyes to make this painting?, BWSMX, Mexico City, Mexico
 2015, Painting The Sky Blue Mallorca Landings, Palma de Mallorca, Spain
 2010, Bagna Cauda, Galerie Art Concept, Paris, France

References 

1978 births
Living people
21st-century American painters
21st-century American male artists
American contemporary painters
American male painters
American abstract artists
Painters from Minnesota